Bobby Vincent Page (born 12 December 1951) is a retired Brigadier General in the United States Air Force who served as the Deputy Chief of Chaplains of the United States Air Force from 2012 to 2016.  In that position he served as the second most senior chaplain in the United States Air Force, the Deputy to the Chief of Chaplains of the United States Air Force, and a member of the Armed Forces Chaplains Board.

Page was nominated for promotion to brigadier general on 10 May 2012, and later promoted to that rank and appointed to his current position on 2 August 2012. He retired on 1 January 2016.

Life and works
Page joined the Air Force in 1974 prior to ordination as a minister, serving for six years as a KC-135 aircraft navigator. He received his commission after graduation from the Reserve Officers Training Corps (ROTC) at Louisiana State University in 1973.

He left active duty to attend Southwestern Baptist Theological Seminary, and was re-commissioned as a chaplain in the United States Air National Guard.  He served with the Air National Guard in Arkansas and Georgia, while he served as the pastor of churches in those States, later joining the Air Reserves in South Carolina.

Page returned to active duty in July 1989, serving in a number of assignments, including an assignment in Baghdad, Iraq, where he established the first USAF chaplain ministry effort at the Baghdad International Airport, before his promotion to brigadier general and appointment as USAF deputy chief of chaplains.

Education
Page's official U.S. Air Force on-line bio lists his educational background as follows:

1973 Bachelor of Arts in history, Louisiana State University, Baton Rouge, La.
1975 Undergraduate Navigator Training, Mather AFB, Calif.
1978 Master of Public Administration, Golden Gate University, San Francisco, Calif.
1983 Master of Divinity, Southwestern Baptist Theological Seminary, Fort Worth, Texas
1990 Squadron Officer School by correspondence
1994 Air Command and Staff College by seminar
1997 Air Force Institute of Technology, Northern Baptist Theological Seminary, Lombard, Ill.
1999 Doctor of Ministry, Northern Baptist Theological Seminary, Lombard, Ill.
2001 Air War College by seminar

Assignments
1. May 1974 - March 1975, Undergraduate Navigator Training, Mather AFB, Calif.
2. March 1975 - June 1975, KC-135 Upgrade Training, Castle AFB, Calif.
3. July 1975 - January 1980, Navigator, Instructor Navigator, Standards and Evaluation Senior Navigator, 307th Air Refueling Group, Travis AFB, Calif.
4. March 1985 - December 1986, Chaplain, 188th Fighter Wing, AR Air National Guard, Fort Smith, Ark.
5. January 1987 - June 1989, Chaplain, Air Force Reserve, 20th Fighter Wing, Shaw AFB, S.C.
6. July 1989 - July 1993, Chaplain, 475th Air Base Wing, Yokota Air Base, Japan
7. July 1993 - July 1996, Senior Chaplain to Tech Training Airmen, 37th Training Wing, Lackland AFB, Texas
8. August 1996 - June 1997, Student: Air Force Institute of Technology, Northern Baptist Theological Seminary, Lombard, Ill. (Faith and Character Formation in Young, Single Adults)
9. June 1997 - July 2000, Chief of Program Development, Office of the Command Chaplain, Air Education and Training Command, Randolph AFB, Texas
10. July 2000 - July 2003, Wing Chaplain, McGuire AFB, N.J.
a. September - December 2000, Wing Chaplain, Deployed to Prince Sultan Air Base (PSAB), Saudi Arabia
b. February - July 2003, Wing Chaplain, Deployed to PSAB and Baghdad International Airport, Iraq
11. August 2003 - May 2004, Strategic and Professional Programs Officer, HQ USAF/HC, Bolling AFB, D.C.
12. May 2004 - June 2006, Chief, Plans and Programs Division, HQ USAF/HC, Bolling AFB, D.C.
13. June 2006 - June 2009, Command Chaplain, Air Combat Command, Langley AFB, Va.
14. June 2009 - August 2012, Command Chaplain, Air Education and Training Command, Randolph AFB, Texas
15. August 2012 – October 2015, Deputy Chief of Chaplains of the United States Air Force

Awards and decorations

Effective dates of promotion
Second Lieutenant 10 August 1973
First Lieutenant 10 February 1976
Captain 10 February 1978
Separated from Active Duty 29 January 1980
Returned to Active Duty 4 July 1989
Captain (Revised) 15 March 1984
Major 1 June 1992
Lieutenant Colonel 1 June 1999
Colonel 1 August 2004
Brigadier General 2 August 2012

References

External links 

United States Air Force generals
Living people
American religious leaders
Deputy Chiefs of Chaplains of the United States Air Force
Golden Gate University alumni
Recipients of the Legion of Merit
1951 births